Girls in Hawaii is a Belgian indie pop band.

Girls in Hawaii's first release was Found in the Ground: The Winter EP in early 2003, after which the band toured through Belgium and France. In the meantime, they started recording what would become their first LP.

From Here To There was released in November 2003 in Belgium and in early 2004 in Europe. It was well-received across Europe, where the band went on a promotional tour, through Belgium, France, Italy, Germany and Spain. The record was later released in Japan, and in October 2005 China Shop Music released it in the United States. The band started a short tour of the West Coast of the United States in April 2006.

Their second full-length album, Plan Your Escape was released in February 2008 in Europe. It was recorded in old houses in the forests of Ardennes by producer Jean Lamoot (who has worked with French artists such as Noir Désir and Alain Bashung). The album, more complex and eclectic than the previous, contains twelve songs, among them, the first single which is called This Farm Will End Up in Fire. The band has toured Europe promoting the album during 2008.

In February 2009, Not Here, a documentary relating the life of the band during that tour has been released in DVD.

On 30 May 2010, 28 years old drummer Denis Wielemans died in a car accident in Brussels.

In 2012 they started working on their third album, Everest. The album was released on September 2, 2013. In the summer of 2014, they released a new EP, Refuge.

In October 2014, they released a live album, Hello Strange, which revisits old songs in an acoustic and / or electronic way.

In September 2017, they released Nocturne, their fourth album.

Members
Current members
Antoine Wielemans - vocals, guitar
Lionel Vancauwenberghe - vocals, guitar
François Gustin - guitar, keyboard
Daniel Offermann - bass
Brice Vancauwenberghe - guitar
Boris Gronemberger - drums

Discography

Albums

EPs
2003: Found in the Ground: The Winter EP (62TV Records)

Contributions
2007: "Out On the Weekend" in Sounds Eclectic: The Covers Project

References

External links
Girls in Hawaii on MySpace
Official Blog 
Official Website

Belgian rock music groups
Belgian pop music groups